A chronological list of Joseph Conrad's works.

Novels 
 Almayer's Folly 1895
 An Outcast of the Islands 1896
 The Nigger of the 'Narcissus' 1897
 Heart of Darkness 1899
 Lord Jim 1900
 Nostromo 1904
 The Secret Agent 1907
 Under Western Eyes 1911
 Chance 1913
 Victory 1915
 The Shadow Line 1917
 The Arrow of Gold 1919
 The Rescue 1920 (begun 1890s)
 The Rover 1923
 Suspense 1925 (unfinished, published posthumously)

Short story collections 

 Tales of Unrest 1898
 Youth, A Narrative; and Two Other Stories 1902
 Typhoon and Other Stories 1903
 A Set of Six 1908
 'Twixt Land and Sea 1912
 Within the Tides 1915
 Tales of Hearsay 1925

With Ford Madox Ford 
 The Inheritors 1901
 Romance 1903 
 The Nature of a Crime 1909

Memoirs and nonfiction 
 The Mirror of the Sea 1906 (MS)
 A Personal Record 1912
 Notes on Life and Letters 1921 (NLL)
 Last Essays 1926 (LE)
 The Congo Diary and Other Uncollected Pieces 1978 (CDOUP)

Chronological list of texts 
1890 Congo Diary (LE and CDOUP)
1890 Up River Book (CDOUP)
1891? The Princess and the Page
1889-1894 Almayer's Folly
1894–95 An Outcast of the Islands
1895 Author's Note to Almayer's Folly
1895–96 The Sisters
1896 An Outpost of Progress (TU)
1896 The Idiots (TU)
1896 The Lagoon (TU)
1896 The Rescue: Part I
1896–97 The Nigger of the 'Narcissus'
1897 Karain (TU)
1897 Preface to The Nigger of the 'Narcissus'
1897 The Return (TU)
1898 Alphonse Daudet (NLL)
1898 An Observer in Malaya (NLL)
1898 Tales of the Sea (NLL)
1898 Jim: A Sketch
1898 The Rescue: Part II and III
1898 Unpublished Letter to The Times about the SS Mohegan Disaster
1898 Youth
1898–99 Heart of Darkness
1898–1902 Romance (with Ford Madox Ford)
1899-1900 Lord Jim
1899-1900 The Inheritors (with Ford Madox Ford)
1900–01 Typhoon
1901 Amy Foster (T)
1901 " Falk"(T)
1901–02 To-morrow (T)
1902 The End of the Tether (Y)
1902–1904 Nostromo
1903 The Books of my Childhood
1904 A Glance at Two Books (LE)
1904 Anatole France I (NLL)
1904 Henry James (NLL)
1904 Letter to the Times about the North Sea Affair
1904 One Day More, Dramatization of To-morrow
1904 A Glance at Two Books (LE)
1904 Preface to Maupassant: Yvette (NLL)
1904–05 Autocracy and War (NLL)
1904–05 The Mirror of the Sea
1905 An Anarchist (S6)
1905 Books (NLL)
1905 Henry James, an Appreciation (NLL)
1905 Gaspar Ruiz (S6)
1905–1912 Chance
1906 The Brute (S6)
1906 My Best Story and Why I Think So (CDOUP)
1906 The Informer (S6)	
1906 The Nature of a Crime (with Ford Madox Ford, CDOUP)
1906 The Secret Agent
1906 John Galsworthy (LE)
1907 The Censor of Plays: An Appreciation (truncated in NLL)
1907–1910 Under Western Eyes
1908 Il Conde (S6)
1908 The Black Mate (TH)
1908 The Duel (S6)
1908–09 A Personal Record
1909 The Secret Sharer (TLS)
1909 The Silence of the Sea (CDOUP)
1910 A Happy Wanderer (NLL)
1910 The Life Beyond (NLL)
1910 The Ascending Effort (NLL)
1911 A Familiar Preface to A Personal Record
1911 A Smile of Fortune (TLS)
1911 Prince Roman (TH)
1911 The Partner (WT)
1912 A Friendly Place for Sailors (NLL)
1912 Freya of the Seven Isles (TLS)
1912 Some Reflections on the Loss of the Titanic (NLL)
1912 Certain Aspects of the Admirable Inquiry into the Loss of the Titanic (NLL)
1912 The Future of Constantinople (LE)
1912–1914 Victory
1913 The Inn of the Two Witches (WT)
1914 Because of the Dollars (WT)
1914 The Planter of Malata (WT)
1914 Protection of Ocean Liners (NLL)
1915 Author's Note to the first American Edition of A Set of Six (CDOUP)
1915 Note to the First Edition of Victory
1915 The Shadow-Line
1915 Poland Revisited (NLL)
1915–1919 The Rescue: Part IV-VI
1916 A Note on the Polish Question (NLL)
1917 Author's Note to Nostromo
1917 Author's Note to Youth
1917 The Tale (TH)
1917 The Warrior's Soul (TH)
1917 Author's Note to Lord Jim
1917 Flight (NLL)
1917 The Unlighted Coast (LE)
1917 Turgenev (NLL)
1917–18 The Arrow of Gold
1918 First News (NLL)
1918 "Well Done!" (NLL)
1918 Tradition (NLL)
1919 Confidence (NLL)
1919 The Crime of Partition (NLL)
1919 Stephen Crane: A Note without Dates (NLL)
1919 Author's Note to A Personal Record
1919 Author's Note to An Outcast of the Islands
1919 Author's Note to The Mirror of the Sea
1919 Author's Note to Typhoon and Other Stories
1919 Memorandum on the Scheme for fitting-out a Sailing Ship (LE)
1919 The Lesson of the Collision. A monograph upon the loss of the "Empress of Ireland."
1919–20 The Secret Agent, a drama
1920 Author's Note to A Set of Six		
1920 Author's Note to Chance
1920 Author's Note to The Rescue
1920 Author's Note to The Secret Agent
1920 Author's Note to The Shadow-Line
1920 Author's Note to Tales of Unrest
1920 Author's Note to 'Twixt Land and Sea
1920 Author's Note to Under Western Eyes
1920 Author's Note to Within the Tides
1920 Author's Notes to Notes on Life and Letters
1920 Author's Note to The Arrow of Gold
1920 Cablegram to the Committee for the Polish Government Loan, Washington (CDOUP)
1920 Laughing Anne, dramatisation of Because of the Dollars
1920–1924 Suspense
1921 Foreword to Corsican and Irish Landscapes (CDOUP)
1921 The Book of Job, translation of a novel by Bruno Winaver
1921 The First Thing I Remember (CDOUP)
1921 The Dover Patrol (LE)
1921 The Loss of the Dalgonar (LE)
1921–22 The Rover
1922 A Hugh Walpole Anthology Introductory Note (CDOUP)
1922 Foreword to J G Sutherland: At Sea with Joseph Conrad (CDOUP)
1922 Outside Literature (LE)
1922 Cookery (LE)
1923 Ocean Travel (LE)
1923 The Torrens: A Personal Tribute (LE)
1923 Christmas Day at Sea (LE)
1923 Travel (LE)
1923 Stephen Crane (LE)
1923 Draft of Speech to Be Made at the Lifeboat Institution (CDOUP)
1923 Foreword to A J Dawson: Britain's Life-boats (CDOUP)
1923 Proust as Creator (CDOUP)
1923 Speech at the Lifeboat Institution (CDOUP)
1924 Geography and Some Explorers (LE)
1924 Preface to The Nature of a Crime (CDOUP)
1924 Warrington Davies: Adventure in the Night (CDOUP)
1924 Preface to The Shorter Tales of Joseph Conrad (LE)
1924 Legends (LE)
Dialogue to Victory, a drama
Gaspar, the Strong man. Script for a silent film
His War Book: A Preface to Stephen Crane's The Red Badge of Courage (LE)

Bibliographies by writer
Bibliographies of English writers